Nabil Samad (born  9 October 1986) in Dhaka is a Bangladeshi cricketer who plays first-class cricket for Sylhet Division. A bowler, he represented Bangladesh in the 2006 U-19 Cricket World Cup in Sri Lanka. Nabil was bought by Sylhet Royals for $20,000 and proved effective from his first game by bowling flat for low economy rates. He joined Chittagong Division for the 2015–16 Bangladeshi cricket season.

In October 2018, he was named in the squad for the Sylhet Sixers team, following the draft for the 2018–19 Bangladesh Premier League.

References

External link
Nabil Samad at ESPNcricinfo

1986 births
Living people
Bangladeshi cricketers
Chittagong Division cricketers
Sylhet Division cricketers
Dhaka Dominators cricketers
Khulna Tigers cricketers
Brothers Union cricketers
Abahani Limited cricketers
Kala Bagan Cricket Academy cricketers
Bangladesh East Zone cricketers
Dhaka Division cricketers
Sylhet Strikers cricketers
Cricketers from Dhaka